Pterolocera amplicornis is a moth of the family Anthelidae. It was described by Francis Walker in 1855. It is found in Australia.

References

Moths described in 1855
Anthelidae